Barsky (masculine), Barskaya (feminine), or Barskoye (neuter) may refer to:
 Barsky (surname) (Barskaya), a surname
 Barsky (rural locality) (Barskaya, Barskoye), several rural localities in Russia
 Barsky Forest, a forest in the Republic of Bashkortostan, Russia